Kittia Carpenter is an American artistic gymnastics coach, judge and is the current Junior Olympic Chairman for Region 5 Gymnastics, a role she has had since April 2013. She is also the Girls Team Director at Buckeye Gymnastics.

Personal life 
Carpenter grew up in Phoenix, Arizona and attended Arizona State University on a full-ride athletic scholarship. She was an elite gymnast and has won National championship titles. She currently lives in the Columbus, Ohio area.

Career 
Carpenter has been coaching at Buckeye Gymnastics in Westerville, Ohio for around 25 years. Currently, she is the Girls Team Director for the club and has coached Nia Dennis, Gabby Douglas and various other Junior Olympic gymnasts.

Additionally, Kittia has her FIG Brevet Judging card and has served as a judge for U.S. Championships and U.S. Olympic Trials in the past. In April 2013, Carpenter was named as the Junior Olympic Chairwoman for Region 5 Gymnastics.

References 

American gymnastics coaches
Arizona State Sun Devils women's gymnasts
Sportspeople from Phoenix, Arizona
Living people
American female artistic gymnasts
Female sports coaches
Year of birth missing (living people)